Claire Jane Sweeney (born 17 April 1971) is an English actress, singer and television personality, best known for playing the role of Lindsey Corkhill in the Channel 4 soap opera Brookside and playing the role of Roxie Hart in the musical Chicago in London's West End.

Early life
Sweeney was born in Walton, Liverpool, the daughter of a butcher who had a shop in Toxteth. She trained at the Elliott-Clarke Theatre School in Liverpool, and worked at weekends in her father's shop.

Her first singing gig was at the age of 14 in the Montrose Club in Liverpool, for which she was paid £25. She was then educated full-time at the Italia Conti Academy of Theatre Arts in London. In 1987, she was a member of the Southport Summer Youth Theatre Workshop's production of the musical Hair.

Career
Sweeney's first major role was as Lindsey Corkhill in the soap opera Brookside, initially as a recurring character from 1991 and then as a leading character from 1995 until the programme ended in 2003.

In 2001 Sweeney appeared in the first series of Celebrity Big Brother and Lily Savage's Blankety Blank, and presented ITV's Challenge of a Lifetime. She was also cast as Roxie Hart in the London revival of the musical Chicago. In the same year she became a brand promoter for Marks & Spencer, and a brand ambassador for Fashion World and SlimFast. 

In 2002 Sweeney became a forces sweetheart and entertained British Army troops serving in Afghanistan. In the same year she released the album Claire, featuring a mix of original material and cover versions: it peaked at number 15 in the UK Albums Chart in July 2002. She also co-presented BBC One's A Song for Europe with Christopher Price.

In 2003, Sweeney starred in the world tour of the musical revue Fosse, and featured on the album Give Me a Smile by Carl Davis and the BBC Concert Orchestra. 

She was a regular panellist on the ITV's Loose Women from 2003 to 2005, and has appeared as a guest panellist several times since then.

In 2004, Sweeney appeared as a contestant on series one of Strictly Come Dancing, being eliminated in week five.

From 2004 to 2006 Sweeney presented the ITV daytime show 60 Minute Makeover.

In 2005 Sweeney presented series four of the Living TV show I'm Famous and Frightened!. She also hosted BBC One's Here Comes the Sun and co-hosted ITV's Chef v Britain with Gino D'Acampo. In May 2005 she was among the performers who took part in A Party to Remember event commemorating the 60th anniversary of VE Day. 

In 2005 and 2006, Sweeney appeared in pantomime productions of Snow White and Aladdin at the Theatre Royal, Nottingham. In July 2006, She took on the role of Miss Adelaide in the British production of Guys and Dolls at the Piccadilly Theatre in London's West End for an eight-week run, before touring the UK alongside Patrick Swayze in the same production.

In 2008 she appeared in the ITV documentary Claire Sweeney's Big Fat Diet, in which she gained  in six weeks as part of a medical experiment.

In December 2008 she starred in the pantomime Snow White at the Regent Theatre, Stoke-on-Trent. In December 2009 she played Carrion the Wicked Fairy in Sleeping Beauty at the Churchill Theatre, Bromley.

In 2010 she sang with Carl Davis and the Liverpool Philharmonic Orchestra in the Battle of Britain 70th Anniversary concert.

In 2011 Sweeney played both "The Girl" in a national tour of Andrew Lloyd Webber's musical Tell Me on a Sunday and Paulette in the first UK tour of Legally Blonde: The Musical. She also starred as Amanda in the BBC sitcom Candy Cabs.

In 2012, Sweeney appeared in the UK tour of Educating Rita. From November 2012 to January 2013 she starred in the White Christmas musical at the Lowry in Salford Quays.

In 2013 Sweeney appeared in Let's Dance for Comic Relief alongside Natalie Cassidy, Dean Gaffney and Ricky Groves, performing to "You Can't Stop the Beat" from Hairspray. They came second to Antony Cotton.

In May and June 2014 she appeared in the comedy musical Sex and the Suburbs, co-written by Sweeney and Mandy Muden, at the Royal Court Theatre, Liverpool.

Since 2015 Sweeney has presented her own series, Magic of the Musicals on Magic Radio.

In 2015 and 2016 Sweeney played Velma Von-Tussle in the UK tour of Hairspray.

In 2019 Sweeney took part in a special episode of Radio 2's Friday Night Is Music Night to celebrate Tony Hatch's 80th birthday. She starred as  Hayley in the BBC sitcom Scarborough, alongside Jason Manford, Stephanie Cole, and Catherine Tyldesley. On Christmas Day 2019 she presented a biography of Cilla Black on Radio 2.

In July 2021, Sweeney performed at G-A-Y alongside drag queen Veronica Green as part of the regular cabaret night “Defying Musicals”.

Sweeney will provide 'alternative Scouse commentary' for the Eurovision Song Contest 2023 final in Liverpool, alongside a member of the public chosen via  BBC Radio Merseyside's "Voice of Eurovision" talent search campaign.

Charitable work
Sweeney supports Claire House Children's Hospice, and is a patron of Queenie's Christmas Charity and the Children's Liver Disease Foundation.

Personal life
Sweeney had a relationship with businessman Tony Hibbard for six years, until 2007. She has a son, Jaxon, with her ex-partner Daniel Reilly.

Discography
Claire (2002)

References

External links

English musical theatre actresses
English television actresses
English television presenters
Alumni of the Italia Conti Academy of Theatre Arts
Actresses from Liverpool
1971 births
Living people
Musicians from Liverpool
Big Brother (British TV series) contestants